Jeremy Burge (born 14 July 1984)
is an emoji historian, founder of Emojipedia, creator of World Emoji Day and widely regarded as an expert on emoji.

Business Insider listed Burge in the UK Tech 100 in 2016, 2017 and 2018 referring to him as "The Emoji Maestro" while other publications have used terms such as "Emoji King" or "Lord of Emojis". The New Yorker dubbed Burge "The Samuel Johnson of Emoji" in 2020.

Emojipedia

In July 2013, Burge started the emoji reference site Emojipedia, after wondering how long the doughnut emoji had been in existence, and not being able to find an answer on Google or Wikipedia. The Sydney Morning Herald reported the site had 23 million page views per month in 2017.

Burge was Chief Emoji Officer at Emojipedia between 2016 and 2022, overseeing all editorial content on the site.

During his time at Emojipedia, Burge worked with professional sportspeople Tony Hawk and Sasha DiGiulian to improve the accuracy of Emojipedia's sample images for the skateboard and rock climber respectively. Jenken Magazine reported: "While they were on the phone one day, Hawk sent Burge a picture of his own board" which was used as the basis of Emojipedia's revised skateboard design.

In 2021, Emojipedia served over 500 million annual page views. Emojipedia was acquired by Zedge in August 2021 for an undisclosed amount.

Unicode 
Currently representing Emojipedia on the Unicode Technical Committee, Burge previously held a position as vice-chair of the Unicode Emoji Subcommittee from 2017 to 2019.

Described as a leading authority on emoji use, Burge urged Apple to rethink its plan to convert the handgun emoji symbol into a water pistol icon in 2016, citing cross-platform confusion. Emoji flags for England󠁧󠁢󠁥󠁮󠁧󠁿, Scotland󠁧󠁢󠁳󠁣󠁴󠁿 and Wales were added to the Unicode Standard in 2017 after a formal proposal co-authored by Burge was approved. Rather than individual code points, they are represented by tag sequences.

Speaking to Crikey in 2022, Burge spoke against superfluous emoji additions: “representation is important but I’m not sure we need another abacus or lab coat emoji”.

Writing 
Burge has been a regular news contributor to Emojipedia and responsible for many of the initial emoji definitions on the reference website. Additionally he has written for publications such Six Colors, Medium, and The Internet Review.

In 2019 Burge raised the issue of Facebook using user-submitted phone numbers for undocumented purposes, and in 2020 identified TikTok accessing user clipboard data on every keystroke.

Podcasting

Burge hosted Emoji Wrap, a podcast from Emojipedia covering "global emoji news and trends" between August 2016 and December 2020 interviewing guests including Mark Davis, Myke Hurley, Jason Snell and Christina Warren.

The Guardian notes that Google product manager Agustin Fonts was "hesitant about shifting to a water pistol" when discussing the Android gun emoji with Burge on the Emoji Wrap podcast.

Public Speaking 
The Evening Standard reported that Burge "lectured on the history and social impact of emojis" at TEDxEastEnd at London's Hackney Empire in 2017. In addition, Burge has spoken at conferences such as The Next Web in Amsterdam, Smart Future in Riga, Design Matters in Copenhagen and Úll in Killarney.

Institutions that have hosted Burge include Eton College, Eye Magazine, Google, London Design Museum, The British Library, and University College London.

World Emoji Day

World Emoji Day is a "global celebration of emoji" created by Burge in 2014. According to the New York Times, he created the day on "July 17 based on the way the calendar emoji is shown on iPhones". Burge told Axios in 2017 that "Tim Cook tweeted about [World Emoji Day] this year so I was kind of excited about that".

In 2017 Burge discussed the origin of World Emoji Day and Emojipedia at AOL BUILD, attended the lighting of the Empire State Building "emoji yellow" with The Emoji Movie voice cast Patrick Stewart, Maya Rudolph and Jake T. Austin, and announced the winners of the annual World Emoji Awards from the New York Stock Exchange.

Saks Fifth Avenue hosted a "Saks Celebrates World Emoji Day" red carpet event in 2017 which was attended by Burge. On World Emoji Day 2019, Burge attended the launch of an exhibition at the National Museum of Cinema and spoke alongside Unicode Consortium co-founder Mark Davis at The British Library.

Burge claimed to “relax and enjoy it [World Emoji Day] at least once” in 2022, after stepping down from Emojipedia.

Personal life 
Burge was born in Western Australia, and educated at Assumption College, Kilmore before graduating from Deakin University. In the spring of 2019 Burge moved onto a 53 ft narrowboat named Dottie M and gained popularity on TikTok with viral clips navigating rivers and canals of the United Kingdom.

References

External links

 Jeremy Burge's personal page

1984 births
Living people
Australian bloggers
Australian podcasters
People involved with Unicode